The 64th 500 Mile International Sweepstakes was held at the Indianapolis Motor Speedway in Speedway, Indiana on Sunday, May 25, 1980. Johnny Rutherford won the pole position, led 118 laps, and won the race by a commanding 29.92 second margin. After failing to finish the race the year before (with Al Unser behind the wheel), Jim Hall's radical new Chaparral 2K ground effects chassis was a heavy favorite entering the month, and drove a flawless race. Rutherford, the winner in 1974 and 1976, became the sixth driver to win the Indy 500 three times.

Tom Sneva broke an Indy 500 record by becoming the first driver to start last (33rd) and lead the race. Sneva led two times for 16 laps, and finished the race in second position. Sneva likewise became the first driver in Indy history to start last and finish second (a feat tied by Scott Goodyear in 1992). It was Sneva's third runner-up finish in four years, matching Bill Holland's achievement exactly 30 years earlier in 1947, 1948 and 1950. Sneva's efforts were often branded afterwards with a "bridesmaid" reference, until he would finally go on to win the race in 1983.

The starting lineup featured 10 rookies, a sharp contrast from 1979, which had only one.

For the first time in Indy history, the three drivers that started in the eleventh and final row finished in the top eight — Tom Sneva 2nd, Gary Bettenhausen 3rd, and Tom Bigelow 8th.

Background
After the tumultuous and controversial month of May at Indy in 1979, the landscape of Indy car racing was starting to settle into a more civilized fashion. During the offseason, USAC published their 1980 schedule, which featured such races as the Indianapolis 500, Ontario, Talladega, and Charlotte. Meanwhile, CART released their own schedule. Before the season began, the leaders of USAC and CART jointly formed the new Championship Racing League (CRL) to co-sanction the season of events. Several of the USAC-planned events were scrapped, including Talladega, Charlotte, Mosport, and Road Atlanta, and the two schedules were instead merged.

A major change for 1980 designated the Indianapolis 500 now as an "Invitational" event, rather than an "Open" type event. This was done, in part, to prevent the uproar of denied entries as happened in 1979. Originally the plan was to grant automatic invitations to the teams that competed in all three 500-mile "Triple Crown" races in 1979 (Indianapolis, Pocono, and Ontario). However, that plan was scuttled when only one car (Danny Ongais) fulfilled those conditions, and furthermore when Ontario switched alliances to the CART series. In January 1980, the criteria for receiving an invitation to the Indianapolis 500 was announced, and essentially included any certified team in USAC or CART that was judged to have a realistic intent of making a qualifying attempt. Brand new teams were subject to review, and required written documentation of the operational plans. In general, the new invitational rules would exclude few, if any, teams in Indy car racing, whether they were part of the USAC Trail or the CART series.

The 1980 CART PPG Indy Car World Series began in April, and Indianapolis was the second race of the season. CART awarded points for Indianapolis towards their championship. After Indianapolis, Speedway officials became unhappy with the CRL arrangement. In the middle of July, after a total of five races had been run, USAC would pull out of the CRL.

Rule changes
Going into the month USAC dropped turbocharger "boost" levels to 48 inHG across the board. Previously the levels were 50 inHG, and before that 80 inHG. The rule change slowed cars down by as much as 8-10 mph, and drew the ire of many competitors. Outspoken critics included A. J. Foyt who referred to it as "taxicab racing," and Johnny Rutherford who said it made it difficult to pass other cars.

Race schedule

Time trials

Pole Day – Saturday May 10
The first day of time trials opened with cloudy skies and temperatures in the low 70s (°F). Scattered rain showers were in the forecast. The favorites for the pole included Mario Andretti, Johnny Rutherford, and rookie Tim Richmond. A. J. Foyt was also a dark horse for the front row. Richmond had set the fastest lap of the month (193.507 mph) in practice, but a crash on pole day morning sidelined him for the weekend.

Defending champion and defending pole winner Rick Mears was the first driver out to qualify at 11:00 a.m., and he set the early pace at 187.490 mph. An hour later, Spike Gehlhausen (188.344 mph) knocked Mears off the top spot. At 12:45 p.m., Mario Andretti took over the provisional pole with a speed of 191.012 mph.

A short rain shower closed the track for 20 minutes.

At 2:08 p.m., Johnny Rutherford in the Jim Hall Chaparral 2K chassis (nicknamed the "Yellow Submarine" due to its bright yellow Pennzoil paint job) took to the track. Rutherford secured the pole position with a four-lap average speed of 192.256 mph.

The next car out was Bobby Unser, who squeezed on to the front row with a speed of 189.994 mph. A. J. Foyt, took to the track twice – the first attempt he waved off before taking the green flag, and the second attempt was aborted due to a rain shower. After a rain and hail delay of over an hour and a half, Foyt got one last chance to qualify. His speed of 185.500 mph was good enough only for 12th starting position.

At the end of the first day of time trials, the field was filled to 16 cars.

Second Day – Sunday May 11
Three cars completed runs, with Danny Ongais (186.606 mph) the fastest of the afternoon. Gordon Johncock, who broke his ankle in a practice crash on Thursday, got in a back-up car to qualify for 18th starting position.

Third Day – Saturday May 17
The third day of time trials was rained out. With a starting spot at Indy secured for the middle of the front row, Mario Andretti flew to Monte Carlo for the Monaco Grand Prix. Andretti would finish 3 laps down in 7th, then would return to Indy on Carburetion Day.

Tom Sneva, who had qualified 14th, wrecked his primary car during the second week of practice. His team obtained a back-up car, and Sneva arranged to drive that car in the race. According to the rules, Sneva would move to the rear of the field, and start the race in last (33rd) position.

Bump Day – Sunday May 18
The final day of time trials opened with 14 spots open. There were roughly 38 cars in the garage area prepared to qualify, and the day was expected to be busy and hectic.

Non-stop qualifying took place when the track opened at noon. The field was filled to 33 cars by 2:40 p.m. Rookie Tim Richmond was the fastest of the day at 188.334 mph, the 5th-fastest car overall in the field. Tony Bettenhausen Jr. (176.410 mph) was the first driver on the bubble.

The bumping began with John Martin bumping out Bettenhausen. In total, seven drivers were bumped by 4 p.m. Eventually, Martin was bumped himself.

With weather starting to enter the area at 4 o'clock, time was running out for qualifying. Gary Bettenhausen (Tony's brother) was now on the bubble. Bettenhausen survived three attempts over the next 15 minutes. At 4:20 p.m., Ron Shuman was lined up to make an attempt, but rain began to fall before he pulled away. Bettenhausen held on to make the field, and the track was closed for the day.

Carburetion Day – Thursday May 22
The final practice session before race day saw Mario Andretti set the best lap at 189.954 mph. Tom Bagley spun and crashed in turn 3, but he was uninjured. Bill Vukovich blew his engine. A total of 31 of the 33 qualified cars took laps.

Later on, Tom Bigelow's AMI Racing/Sherman Armstrong team won the Miller Pit Stop Contest.

Tragedy struck in the infield during the session. Timothy Scott Vail, 19, of Indianapolis, was killed in the infield when his jeep overturned in the notorious "Snake Pit" area of the turn 1 infield. He suffered a fractured skull.

Starting grid

† - Tom Sneva qualified 14th on pole day, but afterwards suffered a crash during practice. The car was replaced with a back-up car, and he was moved the rear of the field.

Alternates
First alternate: John Martin (#37) – Bumped
Second alternate: Bill Alsup  (#41) – Bumped

Failed to qualify

Salt Walther (#76) – Bumped
Pete Halsmer  (#34) – Bumped
Sheldon Kinser (#24) – Bumped
Tony Bettenhausen Jr.  (#32) – Bumped
Roger Mears  (#97) – Wave off
Joe Saldana (#69) – Wave off
Rick Muther (#82) – Spun out during qualifying attempt
Bob Harkey (#67) – Incomplete qualifying attempt
Howdy Holmes (#43, #45) – Incomplete qualifying attempt
Bill Tempero  (#65) – Incomplete qualifying attempt
Ron Shuman  (#78) – Incomplete qualifying attempt
Herm Johnson  (#28) – Incomplete qualifying attempt
Lee Kunzman (#59) – Incomplete qualifying attempt
John Mahler (#91) – Incomplete qualifying attempt
Phil Caliva  (#47) – Incomplete qualifying attempt
Rich Vogler  (#50) – Mechanical problems on Bump Day
Phil Threshie (#30) – Too slow to receive qualifying sticker
Jan Sneva  (#50, #77) – Practice crash
Frank Weiss  (#68) – Practice crash (fractured knee and ankle)
Larry Dickson (#80)
Tom Frantz  (#57)
Janet Guthrie (#51, #55)
Jim Hurtubise (#56)
Al Loquasto (#81)
Bill Puterbaugh
Vern Schuppan (#89)
John Wood  (#42)

Race summary

Pre-race
Mary F. Hulman gave the command to start engines shortly before 11:00 a.m. With Janet Guthrie failing to qualify, the command reverted to the traditional "Gentlemen, start your engines!" for the first time since 1976.

While sitting on the starting grid, polesitter Johnny Rutherford claims that a lady bug landed on his uniform — and considered it a fortuitous good luck omen.

First half
At the start, polesitter Johnny Rutherford and Bobby Unser went into turn one side-by-side, with Rutherford taking the lead. Mario Andretti settled into third. Larry "Boom Boom" Cannon and Mike Mosley were both out with engine problems in the first 5 laps.

The first of several cautions came out on lap 4, for a tow-in for Cannon. On lap 9, the yellow was out again for a crash between Bill Whittington and Dick Ferguson. Ferguson hit the inside wall in the southchute hard, sustaining a broken toe. Whittington needed assistance out of his car and suffered a broken right leg. The race was restarted, and after only one lap of green, Spike Gehlhausen crashed in turn 1.

During the sequence of pit stops and yellows, the lead changed hands several times in the first 60 laps. Rookie Tim Richmond led lap 73, then on lap 74, Tom Sneva set an Indy 500 record by leading the race after starting last (33rd).  Sneva led the next 11 laps.

After leading 10 laps during the race, and being in contention, Mario Andretti dropped out with engine trouble.

Second half
At the halfway point, 20 cars were still running. Bobby Unser led at the halfway point. Johnny Rutherford, Rick Mears, and Tom Sneva were all in the top five.

Bobby Unser dropped out with turbo failure after 126 laps. Jerry Sneva crashed in turn one on lap 132 while two laps down, suffering a bruised knee. With Unser out, Johnny Rutherford dominated most of the second half, but Tom Sneva and Rick Mears both managed to lead laps, and were far from out-of-contention.

On lap 172, Rick Mears took the lead, with Sneva second, Rutherford third. One final scheduled pit stop remained for the leaders. Rutherford was the first to pit, under green. A. J. Foyt brought out the yellow on lap 177 for stalling in turn 3. Mears held a 20-second lead. Tom Sneva ducked into the pits under the yellow for tires and fuel. One lap later, leader Mears was in the pits. Mears gambled with track position, and took on only fuel. Still under the yellow, Johnny Rutherford assumed the lead, and Mears' strategy failed and he dropped to third.

Finish
In the final 20 laps, Johnny Rutherford held a comfortable lead over Tom Sneva, and was pulling away at will. Third place was now being dueled out between Gary Bettenhausen and Gordon Johncock. In the final stages, Rick Mears ducked into the pits for an unscheduled stop to change a punctured tire, which dropped him from contention.

With Rutherford cruising to a certain victory, and second-place Sneva also unchallenged, the attention began to focus on the battle for third place. Gordon Johncock was tucked right behind Gary Bettenhausen. Danny Ongais (7th place) was right with them, albeit a lap down.  On the final lap, Bettenhausen held a car-length advantage as they approached turn 4. Suddenly, Ongais smacked the outside wall exiting turn four. Johncock attempted a slingshot pass at the line, but Bettenhausen held him off for third place by 0.27 seconds.

Rutherford won his third Indy 500 by a margin of 29.92 seconds over Tom Sneva. Sneva was lauded for charging from last starting position (33rd) to a second-place finish. He became the first driver in Indy history to do so. He missed, by 29 seconds, becoming the first driver in history to win the Indy 500 after starting dead last. Sneva was disappointed by the defeat stating: "The car was good but it looks like no matter how good I am or how good the car is, I will always just be finishing second."

As Rutherford was pulling into the pits off his victory lap, rookie Tim Richmond ran out of fuel and stopped at the head of the mainstretch. Richmond, the future NASCAR star and "hot shot" personality on the circuit, led one lap during the race, was credited with 9th place, and won the rookie of the year. Rutherford stopped next to Richmond's car, and signaled for Richmond to hop on board and ride back to the pits. With much applause from the crowd, Richmond rode in on the sidepod of the winner's machine and the two exchanged congratulatory waves and handshakes.

The race was slowed by a then-record 13 cautions for 65 laps - race records that would stand until 1988 and 1992, respectively.

Box score

‡ Pancho Carter was penalized one lap for passing the pace car under yellow on lap 58. At the end of the race, Carter was running approximately 20 seconds behind Rutherford; the penalty reduced his standing from 2nd to 6th. Carter's team protested the ruling, claiming he was waved past the pace car, but USAC upheld the penalty.

Race statistics

Broadcasting

Radio
The race was carried live on the IMS Radio Network. Paul Page served as anchor for the fourth year. Lou Palmer reported from victory lane. Rodger Ward, who previously served as a commentator for ABC Sports, joined the crew as "Driver Expert." It was the first time that a former winner served as the expert. This was the last year of Bob Jenkins on the Backstretch. This would be the final year for Darl Wibel on the crew.

The reporting location for turn one was located atop the Southwest Vista grandstand, whereas in other years it was normally in the upper deck of the E Stand.

Television
The race was carried in the United States on ABC Sports on a same-day tape delay basis. For the first time, the broadcast was expanded to three-hours. Chris Schenkel rode along and reported live from inside one of the pace cars at the start of the race.

The broadcast has re-aired on ESPN Classic since May 2011.

Gallery

Notes

See also
 1980 USAC Championship Car season

References

Works cited
1980 Indianapolis 500 Official Track report 1980
Indianapolis 500 History: Race & All-Time Stats - Official Site
1980 Indianapolis 500 Radio Broadcast, Indianapolis Motor Speedway Radio Network

Indianapolis 500 races
Indianapolis 500
Indianapolis 500
Indianapolis